The Illinois State Bar Association High School Mock Trial Invitational is a mock trial tournament that has been held every year since 1983. The event is administered by the Illinois State Bar Association. The winning team represents the state of Illinois at the National High School Mock Trial Championship. Originally held in Springfield, Illinois, the invitational moved to Champaign, Illinois in 2013, before moving back to Springfield for the 2019 competition. In 2019, 40 high schools participated. The defending champion is York Community High School.

Format

Each school must submit a roster of no more than ten members. The tournament consists of two preliminary rounds, with each school having a chance to represent both the plaintiff/prosecution and defense. After the first two rounds, the eight highest scoring teams advance to a final round. The team with the highest point total following the final round wins the competition. At the end of the competition, several students are awarded outstanding attorney and outstanding witness awards, and the top three placing teams are announced.

Past Champions

The following is a list of invitational champions:
2020: Evanston Township High School.
2019: York Community High School
2018: St. Charles North High School
2017: St. Charles North High School 
2016: Timothy Christian School (Illinois)
2015: Hinsdale Central High School 
2014: St. Charles North High School. 
2013: Hinsdale Central High School
2012: Hinsdale Central High School
2011: Glenwood High School (Illinois)
2010: Hinsdale Central High School
2009: Hinsdale Central High School
2008: Highland Park High School (Highland Park, Illinois)
2007: Glenbard East High School
2006: Timothy Christian School (Illinois)
2005: Hinsdale Central High School
2004: Timothy Christian School (Illinois)
2003: Timothy Christian School (Illinois)
2002: Timothy Christian School (Illinois)
2001: Boylan Catholic High School
2000: Timothy Christian School (Illinois)
1999: Boylan Catholic High School
1998: Timothy Christian School (Illinois)
1997: Glenbard South High School
1996: Hinsdale Central High School
1995: Mt. Vernon Township High School (Illinois)
1994: Hinsdale Central High School
1993: Glenbard South High School
1992: Glenbard South High School
1991: Hinsdale Central High School
1990: Hinsdale Central High School
1989: St. Charles East High School
1988: Hinsdale Central High School
1987: Marian Central Catholic High School
1986: Glenbard South High School
1985: Glenbard South High School
1983–84: No winners announced.

Results By School

The following schools have placed in the top 3 at least once:

National Championship

The winner of the ISBA High School Mock Trial Invitational has represented the state at the National High School Mock Trial Championship since its inaugural tournament in 1984. No Illinois team has ever won the tournament, although Hinsdale Central High School finished in 2nd place in 2010. Most recently, Illinois finished 13th at the 2019 National Championship in Athens, Georgia.

References 

Legal education in the United States
Intellectual competitions
Annual events in Illinois
1983 establishments in Illinois